The 2021 FC Dallas season was the club's 26th season in Major League Soccer, the top tier of American soccer. On September 19, Luchi Gonzalez was relieved of duties as head coach. Marco Ferruzzi served as interim head coach for the remainder of the 2021 season.

Background

Transfers

In 

|}

Draft picks

Out

Club

Roster 
As of July 21, 2021.

Out on loan

Competitions

Preseason

MLS

Western Conference standings 
Western Conference

Overall standings

Results summary

Results by round

Regular season 
Kickoff times are in CDT (UTC-05) unless shown otherwise

MLS Cup Playoffs

U.S. Open Cup 

On July 20, US Soccer announced the tournament would be cancelled in 2021 and would resume for the 2022 season.

Statistics

Appearances 
Numbers outside parentheses denote appearances as starter.
Numbers in parentheses denote appearances as substitute.
Players with no appearances are not included in the list.

 Goals and assists 

 Disciplinary record 

Player name(s) in italics'' transferred out mid-season.

Goalkeeper stats

Kits

See also 
 FC Dallas
 2021 in American soccer
 2021 Major League Soccer season

References

Dallas, FC
Dallas, FC
Dallas, FC
FC Dallas seasons